Kold Sweat Records was a British independent record label specializing in hip hop music, based in Askew Road, London. The label was founded in 1990 by Tony Powell, who was the Managing Director, CEO at MCA Records between 1987 and 1992. Upon leaving MCA, Powell created Kold Sweat which was considered as a small project specific to the hip hop genre. He later employed Angelo Starr as recording engineer who was brother to the late Edwin Starr. The label had originally been created as an alternative to directly address the growing and popular trend of the emerging new and unsigned British rap acts throughout the UK.

Artists who recorded for Kold Sweat Records included:
Blak Prophetz
F9's
SL Troopers
Korperayshun
Prime Rhyme Masters
Dynametrix
Unanimous Decision
Son of Noise
Katch 22
The D.F.C.

The label closed in 1994 when Tony Powell became Director/CEO of Pinnacle Entertainment.

References

British independent record labels
Record labels established in 1990
Electronic music record labels
Defunct companies based in London
Record labels disestablished in 1994
British hip hop record labels